Clarion may refer to:

Music
 Clarion (instrument), a type of trumpet used in the Middle Ages
 The register of a clarinet that ranges from B4 to C6
 A trumpet organ stop that usually plays an octave above unison pitch
 "Clarion" (song), a 2008 single by multinational band Guillemots

Places

Mexico
 Clarion Island (Isla Clarión), Colima

United States
 Clarion, Illinois
 Clarion, Iowa
 Clarion, Michigan
 Clarion, Utah, a ghost town settled as a Jewish farming colony

Pennsylvania
 Clarion County, Pennsylvania
 Clarion, Pennsylvania, a borough in and the county seat of Clarion County
 Clarion Township, Clarion County, Pennsylvania
 Clarion River, Pennsylvania, a tributary of the Allegheny River
 Clarion University of Pennsylvania, a public university located in Clarion, Pennsylvania

Publishing
 Peninsula Clarion, a regional newspaper published in Kenai, Alaska, U.S.
 Clarion Herald, the official newspaper of the Archdiocese of New Orleans in the U.S. state of Louisiana
 Clarion (magazine), a literary magazine published in Boston, Massachusetts, U.S.
 The Clarion-Ledger, a daily newspaper in the U.S. state of Mississippi, and the second oldest company in that state
 Clarion Workshop, a science fiction and fantasy workshop based in San Diego, California, U.S.
 Clarion West Writers Workshop, a science fiction and fantasy workshop based in Seattle, Washington, U.S.
 The Clarion (British newspaper), a defunct weekly socialist newspaper that was published in the United Kingdom
 Western Clarion, a defunct newspaper that served as the official organ of the Socialist Party of Canada from 1903 to 1925
 The Clarion, a defunct quarterly magazine published by the American Folk Art Museum from 1971 until 1992
 Clarion Books, a young adult publishing imprint of Houghton Mifflin Harcourt
 The Clarion (Canadian newspaper), the Canadian newspaper started by Carrie Best in 1946
 DU Clarion, university newspaper of the University of Denver

Computing
 CLARION (cognitive architecture)
 Clarion (programming language)
 CLARiiON, an EMC disk array

Animals
 Clarion nightsnake (Hypsiglena unaocularis), a small colubrid snake 
 Clarion snake eel (Myrichthys pantostigmius), a tropical, marine eel
 Clarión wren (Troglodytes tanneri), a species of bird 
 Proud Clarion, an American Thoroughbred racehorse, winner of the 1967 Kentucky Derby
 Clarion angelfish (Holacanthus clarionensis), a species of saltwater angelfish

Companies and organizations
 Clarion (company), a Japanese automotive and consumer electronics manufacturer
 Clarion Project, a nonprofit organization based in Washington D.C., USA
 Clarion Hotel, a hotel brand in the United States
 Clarion Hotel Limerick, a hotel in Limerick, Ireland
 Clarion Housing Group, a British housing association
 National Clarion Cycling Club, a cycling club with some 29 member sections in the United Kingdom

Other uses
 Clarion Award, an honor for excellence in communications from the Association for Women in Communications
 Clarion (heraldry), a charge or bearing in heraldry
 Operation Clarion, an extensive Allied campaign of strategic bombing during World War II against Nazi Germany 
 Clarion University of Pennsylvania, a university located in Clarion, PA

See also
 Clarin (disambiguation)